The Ash Tree is a 1975 supernatural drama produced by the BBC. Running at 32 minutes, it was based on the short story "The Ash-tree" by British writer M. R. James which was included in his 1904 collection Ghost Stories of an Antiquary. The story was adapted by David Rudkin as "The Ash Tree", and was part of the BBC's A Ghost Story for Christmas strand. It was first broadcast on 23 December 1975 at 11.35pm. The adaptation stars Edward Petherbridge in the dual role of Sir Richard and Sir Matthew and Barbara Ewing as the witch, Anne Mothersole. It was directed by Lawrence Gordon Clark.

Cast

Edward Petherbridge .. Sir Richard/Sir Matthew 
Barbara Ewing .. Anne Mothersole
Preston Lockwood .. Dr Croome
Lalla Ward .. Lady Augusta
Lucy Griffiths .. Mrs Chiddock
Oliver Maguire .. William Beresford
Clifford Kershaw .. The Witchfinder
Cyril Appleton .. Master Procathro

Synopsis
In 1735 the aristocrat Sir Richard (Edward Petherbridge) inherits his family estate, Castringham Hall in Suffolk, from his recently deceased childless uncle, who in turn had inherited it from his own childless uncle, Sir Matthew (Petherbridge in a dual role). The new owner is determined not to follow the path of his relatives by marrying his fiancée, Lady Augusta (Lalla Ward), and producing heirs. However, Sir Richard is disturbed by the strange infantile noises coming from an ash tree outside his bedroom window and he is haunted by visions of his relative’s role in a witchcraft trial of 1690.

Adaptation
Clark is less than complimentary of his adaptation of The Ash Tree, which he felt didn't make Mistress Mothersole an effective villain, as a result of both his and adaptor David Rudkin's sympathy for witch trial victims; "We know so much about the hysteria of the witch trials and the ignorance and downright evil that fueled them that it was well-nigh impossible to portray her as James intended. Although, even he makes her a complicated character, hinting that she was popular with local farmers and the pagan fertility aspects that this implies. Frankly, I don't think the script quite did justice to the story, and maybe someone else should have a go at it."

Clark gave his writers a lot of leeway in their interpretation of James's original stories, and Rudkin's "television version" changes the well-off Mistress Mothersole (Barbara Ewing), who has property of her own, into a younger and more attractive woman, hinting at a sexual attraction between her and Sir Matthew that would have been unthinkable in James's original 1904 story. Rudkin also changed the relationship between Sir Richard inheriting Castringham Hall from his father and grandfather to his childless uncle and great-uncle in order to be able to introduce the character of Lady Augusta (Lalla Ward in a pre-Doctor Who role).

Locations

Clark relocates the Suffolk scenes of James's original story to Cornwall, with Prideaux Place near Padstow featuring as Castringham Hall. The scene of the hanging of the witches was filmed at the Cheesewring on Bodmin Moor in Cornwall.

References

Adaptations of works by M. R. James
Television films based on short fiction
1975 television films
1975 films
A Ghost Story for Christmas